Hueca Point is the westernmost point of Montagu Island in the South Sandwich Islands. The name "Punta Hueca" (hollow point) was first used in Argentine hydrographic publications of 1953.

References

Headlands of South Georgia and the South Sandwich Islands